Prasophyllum uvidulum, commonly known as the summer leek orchid, is a species of orchid endemic to Victoria. It has a single, tubular leaf and up to twenty five scented, pale green flowers with reddish markings and is only known from a swamp in the north-east of the state.

Description
As with others in the genus, the flowers are inverted so that the labellum is above the column rather than below it. There is a raised, shiny dark green, channelled callus in the centre of the labellum and extending just past the bend of the labellum. Flowering occurs in December and January.

Taxonomy and naming
Prasophyllum uvidulum was first formally described in 2009 by David Jones and Dean Rouse from a specimen collected near Shelley and the description was published in The Orchadian. The specific epithet (uvidulum) is the diminutive form of the Latin word uvidus meaning "damp", "moist" or "humid".

Distribution and habitat
The summer leek orchid grows in moist, grassy areas in tall forest and is only known from the type location.

Conservation
This orchid species is only known from about 20 plants at the type location and is listed as "Threatened" in the Victorian Government Flora and Fauna Guarantee Act 1988.

References

External links 
 

uvidulum
Flora of Victoria
Endemic orchids of Australia
Plants described in 2009